Kafyr-Kumukh (Kafır-Qumuq) is a rural locality (a selo) in Buynaksky District, Republic of Dagestan, Russia. The population was 5,107 as of 2010. There are 47 streets.

Geography 
Kafyr-Kumukh is located 3 km northeast of Buynaksk (the district's administrative centre) by road, on the right bank of the Shuraozen. Khalimbekaul is the nearest rural locality.

References 

Rural localities in Buynaksky District